is a Japanese politician of the Democratic Party of Japan, a member of the House of Representatives in the Diet (national legislature). A native of Tokyo and graduate of Kyoto University, he joined the Ministry of Finance. After leaving the ministry, he was elected for the first time in 2005. In 2004, Kitagami was honored as an Inamori Fellow by the Inamori Foundation and in 2007 as a Young Global Leader at the World Economic Forum (Davos Forum).

References

External links 
 Official website in Japanese.

1967 births
Living people
Politicians from Tokyo
Kyoto University alumni
Members of the House of Representatives (Japan)
Democratic Party of Japan politicians
21st-century Japanese politicians